The Almond A. White House is a historic house in Motley, Minnesota. Built in 1902, the Queen Anne architecture is unique compared to other buildings in the town, and locally, it is referred to as the Motley Castle. Believed to be built as a rural retreat for Mr. A.A. White, a lumber businessman, the house remains a showplace in Motley, and was added to the National Register of Historic Places on March 13, 1986.

Description
From the official nomination form:

References

		
National Register of Historic Places in Morrison County, Minnesota
Houses completed in 1902
1902 establishments in Minnesota
Queen Anne architecture in Minnesota